The mayor of Gore officiates over the Gore District in New Zealand's South Island. Prior to local government reorganisation in 1989, the mayor of Gore officiated over the Gore Borough.

The current mayor is Ben Bell.

List of office holders

Gore Borough

Gore District

References

Gore

Gore District, New Zealand